The 2021 RFL League 1 is a professional rugby league football competition played in the United Kingdom and is the third tier of the sport for Rugby Football League (RFL) affiliated clubs. The sponsors for the league are the bookmakers, Betfred and the league will continue to be known as the Betfred League 1.

Teams
The 2020 season was declared null and void due to the COVID-19 pandemic as was the 2020 Championship season, there was therefore no teams relegated to League 1 for 2021. Due to restructuring in the Championship and Super League, Newcastle Thunder were promoted to the Championship and with the planned entry of Ottawa Aces to the league deferred until 2022, the number of teams to compete in League 1 for 2021 was reduced to 10.

Stadiums and locations

Fixtures and results

The season consisted of 18 rounds with each of the 10 teams playing each other home and away.  Promotion and play-off details together with the fixture list were originally due to be announced early in 2021 but this announcement was delayed after a meeting on 13 January 2021 at which the start of the season was delayed to at least Spring. On 22 January it was announced that the proposed start date for the competition is the weekend of 8–9 May. 

Anticipating that the continuing COVID-19 situation may affect the season, the RFL decided that league position would be based from the outset on win percentage (number of wins divided by number of games played) rather than by competition points as is normal in the league. Postponements were allowed if a team had seven or more players unavailable due to COVID-19 related reasons (e.g. having returned a positive test result or required to isolate following contact with an infected person). In the event of a postponement the clubs were to try and find a new date to play the match otherwise it would be cancelled.  Golden point extra time was not used during this season except in the play-offs. The fixture list was released on 14 February and the promotion arrangements on 4 March.

Regular season table
The team finishing top of the league after the regular season was automatically promoted to the Championship for 2022 with the teams finishing 2nd to 6th taking part in a five-team play-off structure culminating in the promotion play-off final, the winner of which would also be promoted to the Championship. Teams had to complete 70% of their league fixtures to qualify for the play-offs.

Play-offs

The play-off structure and dates were confirmed on 20 August and used the same five-team play-off structure used in 2019.  Matches were played on four consecutive weekends commencing 17 September.

Team bracket

Awards
The end of year awards for the 2021 League 1 season were announced on 29 September 2021.

References

RFL League 1
2021 in English rugby league
RFL League 1